Soul Hits is an album by pianist Les McCann recorded in 1963 and released on the Pacific Jazz label.

Reception

Allmusic gives the album 4 stars.

Track listing 
 "Back at the Chicken Shack" (Jimmy Smith) - 3:58
 "Sack O' Woe" (Cannonball Adderley) - 3:06
 "Groove Yard" (Carl Perkins) - 3:17
 "Sermonette" (Nat Adderley) - 2:30
 "Sonnymoon for Two" (Sonny Rollins) - 2:38
 "Bags' Groove" (Milt Jackson) - 3:00
 "Shiny Silk Stockings" (Frank Foster) - 3:55
 "Sister Sadie" (Horace Silver) - 4:02
 "Li'l Darlin'" (Neal Hefti) - 3:38
 "Work Song" (Nat Adderley) - 4:10

Personnel 
Les McCann - piano
Joe Pass - guitar
Paul Chambers - bass
Paul Humphrey - drums

References 

Les McCann albums
1963 albums
Pacific Jazz Records albums